Otto Luttrop (1 March 1939 – 21 November 2017) was a German football player and coach. As a player, he spent three seasons in the Bundesliga with TSV 1860 Munich.

He coached mainly in Switzerland. Luttrop died on 21 November 2017, aged 78.

Honours
1860 Munich
 UEFA Cup Winners' Cup finalist: 1964–65
 Bundesliga: 1965–66
 DFB-Pokal: 1963–64

Lugano
 Swiss Cup: 1967–68

Sion
 Swiss Cup: 1973–74

References

External links
 

1939 births
2017 deaths
German footballers
TSV 1860 Munich players
FC Lugano players
FC Sion players
FC Luzern players
SG Union Solingen players
FC Chiasso players
Bundesliga players
2. Bundesliga players
German football managers
FC Luzern managers
SC Westfalia Herne players
FC Chiasso managers
FC Lugano managers
FC Winterthur managers
Association football midfielders
People from Unna (district)
Sportspeople from Arnsberg (region)
Footballers from North Rhine-Westphalia
West German footballers
West German expatriate footballers
West German expatriate sportspeople in Switzerland
Expatriate footballers in Switzerland
West German football managers
West German expatriate football managers